The 1976 Texas Rangers season involved the Rangers finishing 4th in the American League West with a record of 76 wins and 86 losses.

Offseason 
 November 12, 1975: Dave Nelson was traded by the Rangers to the Kansas City Royals for Nelson Briles.
 December 9, 1975: Stan Thomas and Ron Pruitt were traded by the Rangers to the Cleveland Indians for John Ellis.
 March 12, 1976: Mike Kekich was released by the Rangers.

Regular season

Season standings

Record vs. opponents

Notable transactions 
 May 10, 1976: Danny Darwin was signed as an amateur free agent by the Rangers.
 May 17, 1976: Bobby Jones was selected off waivers from the Rangers by the California Angels.
 May 28, 1976: Stan Perzanowski and cash were traded by the Rangers to the Cleveland Indians for Fritz Peterson.
 June 1, 1976: Bill Singer, Roy Smalley, Mike Cubbage, Jim Gideon, and $250,000 were traded by the Rangers to the Minnesota Twins for Bert Blyleven and Danny Thompson.
 June 8, 1976: 1976 Major League Baseball Draft
Billy Sample was drafted by the Rangers in the 10th round.
Andre Robertson was drafted by the Rangers in the 12th round, but did not sign.

Roster

Player stats

Batting

Starters by position 
Note: Pos = Position; G = Games played; AB = At bats; H = Hits; Avg. = Batting average; HR = Home runs; RBI = Runs batted in

Other batters 
Note: G = Games played; AB = At bats; H = Hits; Avg. = Batting average; HR = Home runs; RBI = Runs batted in

Pitching

Starting pitchers 
Note: G = Games pitched; IP = Innings pitched; W = Wins; L = Losses; ERA = Earned run average; SO = Strikeouts

Other pitchers 
Note: G = Games pitched; IP = Innings pitched; W = Wins; L = Losses; ERA = Earned run average; SO = Strikeouts

Relief pitchers 
Note: G = Games pitched; W = Wins; L = Losses; SV = Saves; ERA = Earned run average; SO = Strikeouts

Awards and honors 
Jim Sundberg, C, Gold Glove, 1976
All-Star Game

Farm system 

LEAGUE CHAMPIONS: GCL Rangers

Notes

References

External links 
1976 Texas Rangers team page at Baseball Reference
1976 Texas Rangers team page at www.baseball-almanac.com

Texas Rangers seasons
Texas Rangers season
Texas Rang